Marchmont railway station served the estate of Marchmont, Scottish Borders, Scotland from 1863 to 1948 on the North British Railway.

History 
The station opened on 16 November 1863 by the North British Railway. The station was situated immediately north east of an unnamed minor road. A signal box and goods sidings were located near the station. The station closed to both passengers and goods traffic in 1948. The station building is still extant.

References

External links 

Disused railway stations in the Scottish Borders
Former North Eastern Railway (UK) stations
Railway stations in Great Britain opened in 1863
Railway stations in Great Britain closed in 1948
1863 establishments in Scotland
1948 disestablishments in Scotland